The Roman Superhighway or Bataan Provincial Highway, formerly known as the Bataan Provincial Expressway, is a , two- to four-lane major highway that connects the municipality of Dinalupihan to the municipality of Mariveles in Bataan, Philippines. The entire road forms part of National Route 301 (N301) of the Philippine highway network.

Etymology 
Roman Superhighway is named after Pablo Roman Sr., the former representative of Bataan who is the acknowledged father of the export processing zone known as Bataan Export Processing Zone (BEPZ; now known as Freeport Area of Bataan).

History  
Construction of the Roman Superhighway began on April 7, 1973 during the Martial Law period and completed on July 16, 1977. The project was implemented by President Ferdinand Marcos. It was originally intended to be an expressway to serve BEPZ in Mariveles, Bataan, but it later became an at-grade highway when local residents built houses and businesses along it.

Phase 2 is measured  and has 12 bridges.

Construction Development Corporation of the Philippines (CDCP) and Monark International worked on the project. CDCP accomplished its task in three years and three months. Phase 2 was completed by Monark in two years and 11 months. The Department of Public Works and Highways (DPWH) designed and supervised the construction of the  road project. Phase 1 costs , while  was spent for Phase 2. The total amount includes the payment for the right-of-way of former agricultural lands. Some of the farmlots were even donated by the owners.

Throughout its existence, rehabilitation works were made on the highway such as applying asphalt overlay either on an existing concrete pavement or both the concrete pavement and the asphalt used on its shoulders and replacing an old pavement with a new one. Recently, some of its portions were widened to accommodate more motorists using the highway.

Route description 
The road passes into nine towns (Dinalupihan, Hermosa, Orani, Samal, Abucay, Pilar, Orion, Limay, and Mariveles) and one city (Balanga) in Bataan.

The highway also serves a major utility corridor, carrying various high voltage overhead power lines through densely populated areas where land and right of way acquisition for a normal power line is impractical. Notable power line using the highway's right of way for most or part of their route is the Hermosa–Calaguiman line from Layac Junction in Dinalupihan to Samal. Various power lines also intersect with the highway on some portions, such as the  Mariveles–Balsik 500,000 volt, Bataan Combined Cycle Power Plant (BCCPP)–Hermosa, Hermosa–Limay, GNPower–Lamao, and Lamao–Limay 230,000 volt transmission lines.

Dinalupihan to Abucay 

The highway starts at Layac, Dinalupihan at a t-junction with the Jose Abad Santos Avenue (Olongapo-Gapan Road). A short section of the highway from Layac Junction to Layac Bridge was formerly a two lane-road, with the said bridge had two lanes before widening into four lanes after passing Layac Bridge until 2015. The road turns westward and pass on Palihan Bridges 1 and 2 and between them are rice fields (formerly, this portion was lower before the construction of newer bridges and roads with higher elevation). The level of a road will become lower after passing these two bridges. An entrance of Subic-Clark-Tarlac Expressway (SCTEX) can be seen on this area. The road continues straightforward, passing through Hermosa Ecozone Industrial Park, and turns eastward upon paralleling with the Bataan National Road. The highway then passes through residential areas of Hermosa, Bataan before it turns westward and continues on a straight direction. It then passes Mambog Bridge and after passing the said bridge is Beverly Heights V and it will turn eastward and continues on a straight route until it reaches Dona Bridge, where the highway enters Orani. It will cross to San Pedro Street, pass through Dona Elementary School, and continues northbound until it intersects Governor Pascual Avenue, with left going to Orani town proper and right going to Sinagtala and Mount Santa Rosa through Binutas Trail. An office of Department of Public Works and Highways (DPWH) - Bataan 1st District can be found on this portion. After it is Orani Bridge 1. It enters Samal through the Orani Bridge 2. The highway continues on a straight direction and crosses the Samal River through Samal Bridge. A few meters away after the bridge is an entrance to Bataan 2020 and Charoen Pokphand Foods Philippines Corporation. It turns westward after passing Bataan 2020, continues to Barangay Gugo, enters Abucay through Calaguiman Bridge, and continues on a straight direction. Between Ray Hill Bridge is Mabatang Vicinial Road which is a road leading to Barangay Mabatang proper. A subdivision named St. Leonard Homes can be seen after the said bridge. The Mabatang Bridge is located after the subdivision. It continues northbound, passing through Calaylayan Bridge, and turns eastward. It then passes through Calaylayan Bridge. A few distance from the bridge is the Petron gasoline station. It follows a straight route and before entering Balanga, the Gerry's Grill restaurant and Toyota Bataan can be found. The highway then passes Tuyo Bridge and upon passing the former location of Balanga welcome sign which was removed due to the highway's widening after the said bridge, it enters Balanga.

Balanga to Mariveles

After passing the former location of Balanga welcome marker, a Camella Homes subdivision can be seen at this portion. The road continues on a straight direction, intersects with Tuyo Vicinal Road, and passing through Penelco main headquarters. A four-lane road named Enrique Garcia Sr. Avenue (named after the Bataan former governor) is located near Penelco headquarters. Pass the four-lane road is Tenejero Bridge. The National Food Authority (NFA) Bataan can be seen after the bridge. It then passes through barangays Munting Batangas where the road turns westward, Camacho, Tenejero after the Tenejero 2 Bridge, Bagong Silang, Cataning, Cupang Proper, and Central. Various schools and malls can be found along the Balanga portion of the highway such as the Bataan National High School, Bataan Heroes College, Vista Mall Bataan, and Waltermart Balanga.

After Barangay Central, it enters Pilar through Talisay Bridge. It passes mostly on rice paddies within the municipality but on Barangay Alauli, there is an intersection of the highway and Governor J.J. Linao Road. Various establishments can be found near the intersection, such as the Total gas station. It turns westward and enters Orion through Campot Bridge. It continues northbound and passes through various barangay within Orion. Between Daan Pare and Puting Buhangin exits, the highway and Bataan National Road intersects temporarily. The highway enters Limay and will pass on some subdivisions such as Trivea Residences. It continues on a straight direction and turns eastward, passing to Mamala and T. Kaliwa Bridges, with Petron Limay station between them. It then passes to Limay Overpass and the entrances of Emerald Coast Executive Village are found on both sides of the highway a few meters after the said overpass. The road turns westward and eastward, then it will pass on a terminus of Bataan National Road. After the terminus of Bataan National Road is Alangan Bridge. It turns eastward and westward, continuing on a straight route, then passes with Petron Bataan Refinery, SMC Consolidated Power Plant, Ayam Bridge, Orica Philippines, Inc., and Lamao Bridge.

The highway then enters Mariveles after passing the Lamao Bridge. It passes through barangays Batangas II (a Philippine National Oil Company (PNOC) plant and PPDC Park can be seen within the barangay), Lucanin, Cabcaben (where the highway parallels with Old National Road), Mt. View (where the Old National Road ends and Blessed Regina Protmann Catholic School (BRPCS) is located), and Alasasin. It continues to Baseco Country through Freeport Area of Bataan (FAB) checkpoint where the Mariveles substation of National Grid Corporation of the Philippines (NGCP) and Mariveles Coal-Fired Power Plant are visible from the highway and a bypass road going to Sisiman is located. The highway then passes the Zigzag Road. After Zigzag Road, it passes through FAB compound, Death March marker upon exiting the FAB compound, Jollibee Mariveles, Mariveles Municipal Hall, and the highway ends at Mariveles Bridge.

Intersections

References

Roads in Bataan